Gnophaela discreta is a moth of the family Erebidae. It was described by Stretch in 1875. It is found in Mexico, Arizona and California.

The wingspan is about 38 mm.

The larvae feed on Mertensia species.

References

Gnophaela
Moths described in 1875